Thelma Schoonmaker (born January 3, 1940) is an American film editor, known for her over five decades of work with director Martin Scorsese. She has received numerous accolades including three Academy Awards, two BAFTA Awards, as well as a Golden Lion in 2014 and the BAFTA Fellowship in 2019. She has received eight Academy Award for Best Film Editing nominations, the most in Academy history alongside frequent Steven Spielberg collaborator Michael Kahn.

She started working with Scorsese on his debut feature film Who's That Knocking at My Door (1967), and has edited all of Scorsese's films since Raging Bull (1980). Schoonmaker has received eight Academy Award nominations for Best Film Editing, and has won three times—for Raging Bull, The Aviator (2004), and The Departed (2006), which were all Scorsese-directed films.

Early life
Schoonmaker was born on January 3, 1940, in Algiers (then part of French Algeria), the daughter of American parents, Thelma and Bertram Schoonmaker. Bertram, descended from the New York Dutch Schoonmaker political family, was employed as an agent of the Standard Oil Company and worked extensively abroad. The Schoonmakers were evacuated to the United States shortly after the Fall of France during the Second World War. In 1941, the family moved to the Dutch-Caribbean island of Aruba, where Schoonmaker's father continued to work for Standard Oil and her mother ran nursery schools. Schoonmaker was primarily raised in Aruba, in a community she described as "a colony of expatriates from over the world"; she also spent part of her childhood in Portugal.

Schoonmaker did not live in the United States until she was an adolescent in 1955, and was initially alienated and dumbfounded by American culture. Schoonmaker was interested in a career in international diplomacy and began attending Cornell University in 1957, where she studied political science and the Russian language. When she graduated from Cornell in 1961, she began taking State Department tests in order to apply for positions in the U.S. government.

Politically inclined and opinionated, Schoonmaker was opposed to the Vietnam War and supported the Civil Rights Movement. She passed the State Department exams but failed the final "stress test" when she expressed distaste for the South African policy of apartheid, a stance which did not sit well with those administering the tests.

Career

While taking a graduate course in primitive art at Columbia University, Schoonmaker saw an advertisement in The New York Times that offered training as an assistant film editor. She responded to the advertisement and got the job. The job entailed assisting an "editor" who was randomly cutting frames from classic European films (such as those by François Truffaut, Jean-Luc Godard and Federico Fellini), so that their length would conform to the running times of U.S. television broadcasts.

She signed up for a brief six-week course in filmmaking at New York University, where she came into contact with young Martin Scorsese, who was struggling to complete his film What's a Nice Girl Like You Doing in a Place Like This? A negative cutter had butchered his film, not leaving enough negative frames to allow for hot splicing, so a film professor asked her to help Scorsese. Schoonmaker edited Scorsese's first feature film, Who's That Knocking at My Door (1967).

At NYU, Schoonmaker also met filmmaker Michael Wadleigh and later edited his influential music festival documentary, Woodstock, on which Scorsese also worked. Her first major film editing work on Woodstock gained Schoonmaker an Academy Award nomination for Best Editing. Her use of superimpositions and freeze frames brought the performances in the film to life, and added to the movie's wide appeal, thus helping to raise the artistry and visibility of documentary film-making to a new level.

The early period of Schoonmaker's career was difficult. Despite being an Oscar nominee, Schoonmaker could not work on feature films unless she became a member of the Motion Picture Editors Guild. The union's entry requirements included spending five years as an apprentice and three as an assistant, which Schoonmaker was unwilling to meet. Schoonmaker remarked, "And I just couldn't see why I, who had been a full editor and had been nominated for an Academy Award, should suddenly have to become an apprentice. ...And of course, they couldn't see the sense of why I, who had never been in the union all those years and had never paid dues all those years and had never served my time in their sense, should be allowed as a full editor. So it was quite understandable on both sides. It was just insane."

Consequently, Schoonmaker did not work with Scorsese in a formal capacity in the 1970s; however, she did make an uncredited contribution to Taxi Driver. Scorsese had decided not to edit the picture during principal photography, but to save all the editing until shooting had wrapped. Unfortunately, this left him very little time to cut the picture, as Columbia's contract stipulated that a finished cut had to be supplied by the middle of February. Scorsese brought in Schoonmaker to help. At one point, Steven Spielberg visited Scorsese and chipped in with some contributions toward the final edit.

In the 1980s, with Scorsese's help, Schoonmaker was finally admitted to the union. The two collaborated on Raging Bull, which garnered Schoonmaker an Academy Award for Best Film Editing.

Personal life

She was introduced to Michael Powell by Scorsese and London-based film producer Frixos Constantine. The couple were married from May 19, 1984, until his death in 1990. The couple had no children.

Since Powell's death, Schoonmaker has dedicated herself to preserving the films and honoring the legacy of her husband, who directed many classic films, including The Red Shoes.

Selected filmography

Who's That Knocking at My Door (1967)
Raging Bull (1980)
The King of Comedy (1982)
After Hours (1985)
The Color of Money (1986)
Bad (1987) - music video
The Last Temptation of Christ (1988)
New York Stories (1989) segment "Life Lessons"
Goodfellas (1990)
Cape Fear (1991)
The Age of Innocence (1993)
Casino (1995)
Grace of My Heart (1996)
Kundun (1997)
Bringing Out the Dead (1999)
Gangs of New York (2002)
The Aviator (2004)
The Departed (2006)
Shutter Island (2010)
Hugo (2011)
The Wolf of Wall Street (2013)
Bombay Velvet (2015)
Silence (2016)
The Snowman (2017) with Claire Simpson
The Irishman (2019)
Killers of the Flower Moon (2023)

Other credits
The Kids Are Alright (1979) (special consultant)
Woodstock (1970) (assistant director & editor)
Boardwalk Empire (episode: "Boardwalk Empire", 2010) (consultant)

Accolades
With eight Academy Award nominations, Schoonmaker tied with Michael Kahn for being the most-nominated editor in Academy Awards history. Tied with Kahn, Daniel Mandell, and Ralph Dawson, she also holds the record for the most wins in the category of Best Editing, with three.

In 2012, the Motion Picture Editors Guild published a list of the 75 best-edited films of all time based on a survey of its membership. Three films edited by Schoonmaker with Scorsese are on this list: Raging Bull (1980), listed first, Goodfellas (1990), listed fifteenth, and Hugo (2011), listed sixty-ninth. Only George Tomasini, the editor of Alfred Hitchcock's films in the 1950s, has more appearances on this list.

Awards and nominations

Academy Awards

BAFTA Awards

Other awards and nominations

1981 – Raging Bull (1980) (won) American Cinema Editors ACE Eddie – Best Edited Feature Film
1991 – Goodfellas (1990) (nominated) American Cinema Editors ACE Eddie – Best Edited Feature Film
1992 – Gotham Below the Line Award (won)
1996 – Casino (1995) (nominated) American Cinema Editors ACE Eddie – Best Edited Feature Film
2000 – Hollywood Film Festival – Hollywood Film Award (won)
2003 – Gangs of New York (2002) (won) American Cinema Editors ACE Eddie – Best Edited Feature Film – Dramatic
2003 – Gangs of New York (2002) (won) Satellite Awards Golden Satellite Award Best Film Editing
2004 – AFI Life Achievement Award: A Tribute to Robert De Niro (2003) (TV) (2004) (nominated) Emmy Award – Outstanding Multi-Camera Picture Editing for a Miniseries, Movie or a Special
2005 – The Aviator (won) American Cinema Editors ACE Eddie – Best Edited Feature Film – Dramatic
2005 – The Aviator (nominated) Satellite Awards Golden Satellite Award Best Film Editing
2005 – The Aviator (nominated) OFCS Award – Online Film Critics Society Awards Best Editing
2007 – The Departed (nominated) American Cinema Editors ACE Eddie – Best Edited Feature Film – Dramatic
2007 – The Departed (nominated) OFCS Award – Online Film Critics Society Awards Best Editing
2007 – Made an honorary Fellow of Canterbury Christ Church University
2014 – 71st Venice International Film Festival – Golden Lion For Lifetime Achievement
2017 – American Cinema Editors Career Achievement Award
2019 – BAFTA Fellowship

See also
List of film director and editor collaborations

References

Further reading
  
 No transcript available.

 
 2007 Coolidge Award Thelma Schoonmaker – The Coolidge Corner Theatre

External links

 
 Schoonmaker, Thelma at Encyclopedia.com
 "Thelma Schoonmaker: From 'Raging Bull' to 'Silence—January 26, 2017 interview on Studio 360

Living people
1940 births
Algerian people of American descent
American Cinema Editors
American film editors
American women film editors
American people of Dutch descent
Artists from New York City
BAFTA fellows
Best Editing BAFTA Award winners
Best Film Editing Academy Award winners
Columbia University alumni
Cornell University alumni
French people of American descent
French people of Dutch descent
People from Algiers